The 2011–12 season of the OK Liga was the 43rd season of top-tier rink hockey in Spain.

Barcelona Hoquei won their twenty-fourth OK Liga title.

Teams

Final standings

Top goal scorers

Copa del Rey

The 2012 Copa del Rey was the 69th edition of the Spanish men's roller hockey cup. It was played in Vilanova i la Geltrú between the eight first qualified teams after the first half of the season.

Quarter-finals

Semifinals

Final

References

External links
Real Federación Española de Patinaje

OK Liga seasons
2011 in roller hockey
2012 in roller hockey
2011 in Spanish sport
2012 in Spanish sport